B43 or b43 may refer to:
 Broadcom b43, linux wifi-driver and firmware
 Bundesstraße 43, a German road
 B43 (New York City bus) in Brooklyn
 B43 nuclear bomb
 B43, an anti-CD19 antibody 
 B-43 Jetmaster, an aircraft